Devarakonda Karthika Anagha (born June 29, 1991), is a South Indian Carnatic classical vocalist and a recipient of the Bal Shree Award (2007) - a national award given by the President of India for children excelling in creative fields.

References

1991 births
Living people
Women Carnatic singers
Carnatic singers
21st-century Indian women singers
21st-century Indian singers